Brigadier General Cornelius "Neily" Vanderbilt III (September 5, 1873 – March 1, 1942) was an American military officer, inventor, engineer, and yachtsman. He was a member of the Vanderbilt family.

Early life
Born in New York City to Cornelius Vanderbilt II and Alice Claypoole Gwynne, he was educated by private tutors at St. Paul's School in Concord, New Hampshire, then attended Yale University and graduated with a Bachelor of Arts degree in 1895. Against his father's wishes, in August 1896 he married Grace Graham Wilson, the youngest child of New York banker Richard Thornton Wilson Sr., and Melissa Clementine Johnston. As a consequence, his father disinherited him. Remaining at Yale until 1899, he earned a Bachelor of Philosophy degree and, having a great deal of interest in the technical aspects of his family's railroad business, he also earned a Master of Engineering degree in mechanical engineering.

Inheritance
Upon his father's death in 1899 Vanderbilt received $500,000 in cash and the income from a $1 million trust fund. The bulk of his father's $70 million estate went to Vanderbilt's brother Alfred, who then transferred $6 million to Vanderbilt. However, as a result of his parents' attitude towards his marriage, it would be 27 years after his father's death before he finally reconciled with his aging mother. Vanderbilt and his wife Grace remained married until his death and had two children, Cornelius IV (1898–1974), who would marry seven times, and Grace (September 25, 1899 – January 28, 1964).

Interests
Neily Vanderbilt was an inveterate tinkerer with all things mechanical and patented more than thirty inventions for improving locomotives and freight cars, including several which brought him a significant royalty income. Some of the most important were a corrugated firebox for locomotives that resulted in a substantial increase in fuel efficiency, a cylindrical styled tank car for the transport of bulk oil, and a revolutionary type of locomotive tender. In addition, on his travels to London and Paris he saw the potential for adapting their subway systems for use in New York City and partnered with August Belmont Jr. to establish the Interborough Rapid Transit Company for the construction of the city's first subway.

In 1906 he was admitted as an hereditary member of the Rhode Island Society of the Cincinnati by right of his descent from Surgeon Henry Collins Flagg of the Continental Army.

Yachting
As with other members of the Vanderbilt family, yachting was one of Vanderbilt's favorite pastimes as an escape from a busy life that included a seat on the boards of directors of a number of major American corporations. He was a member of the nine-member syndicate that built the yacht Reliance, the largest racing yacht in history with a crew of 70, for the successful defense of the America's Cup in 1903.

He was commodore of the New York Yacht Club from 1906 to 1908. In 1910, he skippered his 65-foot sloop Aurora to victory in the New York Yacht Club's race for the King Edward VII Cup in Newport, RI.

Prior to the First World War, Vanderbilt's personal yacht was the North Star in which he and his family toured Europe and hosted many distinguished guests including King Edward VII, Kaiser Wilhelm II and Czar Nicholas II.  The North Star was in British waters at the outbreak of the First World War in 1914, and was seized by the British government for use as a hospital ship with the promise it would be returned after the war.  The North Star was damaged in action and was used after the war as a merchant ship trading with China.

On April 29, 1930, Vanderbilt's yacht, the Winchester, was set ablaze following an explosion.  No one was injured as the crew were all eating in the galley, up front, but her owner's suite and guest suite's sustained $500,000 of damage.

Military service
In 1901, he was commissioned a second lieutenant in the 12th Infantry Regiment of the New York National Guard and he remained a member of the National Guard for 33 years. He was promoted to first lieutenant in December 1902 and served as an aide-de-camp to the Governor of New York from September 1903 to December 1904. He was promoted to captain in June 1907 and served as an aide to the division commander from October 1908 until being promoted to lieutenant colonel and inspector general in June 1912.

Along with most of the National Guard, Vanderbilt was mobilized on 30 June 1916 and served on the Mexican border. When the United States declared war on Germany and entered World War I in April 1917. Vanderbilt was promoted to colonel on 20 July 1917 and placed in command of the 22nd Engineer Regiment of the New York National Guard. The regiment was re-designated as the 102nd Engineer Regiment on 1 October 1917 and became part of the newly organized 27th Division, which was composed of activated units of the New York National Guard. The 27th Division departed New York for Camp Wadsworth in Spartanburg, South Carolina in September 1917 and was shipped overseas to France in May and June 1918.

In July 1918, shortly after his arrival in France, Vanderbilt was promoted to brigadier general.  Shortly thereafter, he returned from France to the United States and was assigned to Camp Lewis in Washington state, where he arrived on August 20 and assumed command of the 25th Brigade, which was part of the 13th Division of which he was acting commander from August 20 to September 11, 1918. As most new recruits and draftees were being sent to France to replace casualties, the 13th Division never reached full strength until November 1, 1918, which was just nine days before the armistice with Germany which ended hostilities, and, therefore, it was never sent overseas.  General Vanderbilt was reassigned on December 20, 1918 and was discharged from the army on January 3, 1919.

Military awards
For his services during the war, General Vanderbilt was decorated with the Army Distinguished Service Medal by the War Department and the New York State Conspicuous Service Cross (recipient #190).  He was also made a commander of the Order of the Crown of Belgium and was awarded that country's Croix de Guerre. The government of France invested him as a Commander of the Legion of Honor.  He was also a recipient of the Mexican Border Service Medal and World War I Victory Medal.

His citation for the Army Distinguished Service Medal, awarded in 1919, is as follows:

The President of the United States of America, authorized by Act of Congress, July 9, 1918, takes pleasure in presenting the Army Distinguished Service Medal to Brigadier General Cornelius Vanderbilt, United States Army, for exceptionally meritorious and distinguished services to the Government of the United States, in a duty of great responsibility during World War I. As Commanding Officer, 102d Engineers, and as Engineer Officer of the 27th Division, General Vanderbilt's marked qualities of leadership and thorough training and instruction developed a high state of military efficiency in his command, as demonstrated throughout its entire service.

Post war service
After the war, Vanderbilt remained active in the New York National Guard and Organized Reserve.  He commanded the 77th Division of the Organized Reserve Corps from May 1922 to January 1929, and from November 1929 until relinquishing command in January 1935.

Postwar life

Following the First World War, Vanderbilt and his wife frequently returned to Europe, becoming friends and guests of numerous members of European royalty including former Kaiser Wilhelm II of Germany, and his brother, Prince Henry of Prussia,  King Albert I of Belgium, Crown Prince Olav of Norway, Queen Marie of Romania, Reza Pahlavi of Iran, and every British monarch since Queen Victoria.

Residences
In 1914, Vanderbilt inherited a spacious mansion located at 640 Fifth Avenue in New York City from his uncle George Washington Vanderbilt II. Built in 1880 by William Henry Vanderbilt, the mansion was originally one of two sharing that block designed with identical exteriors and together known as the "Twin Mansions." It was to be his permanent residence for the rest of his life, because although he sold the mansion in 1940 to members of the Astor family, he and his family retained occupancy of the house for three years after his death in 1942. Neily's wife Grace lived there until 1944, when she moved into the William Starr Miller House at 1048 Fifth Avenue which still stands today as the Neue Galerie.

Vanderbilt also had a summer residence in Newport, Rhode Island named Beaulieu which was designed by Calvert Vaux. The mansion is located on fashionable Bellevue Avenue and is adjacent to the Marble House which was built by Vanderbilt's uncle William K. Vanderbilt. Vanderbilt's widow retained Beaulieu as her summer residence until her death, after which it was sold to Ambassador Wiley T. Buchanan, Jr. (1913-1986).

Death
Brigadier General Cornelius Vanderbilt III died aboard his yacht from a cerebral hemorrhage while vacationing in Miami Beach, Florida in 1942.

Grace Vanderbilt died on January 7, 1953.  She was entombed beside her husband in the Vanderbilt Family Mausoleum in New Dorp on Staten Island, New York.

Dates of rank
2nd Lieutenant, 12th Infantry, New York National Guard - 20 September 1901
1st Lieutenant - 2 December 1902
Captain - 11 June 1907
Major - never held
Lieutenant Colonel (Inspector General, Headquarters, New York National Guard) - 1 June 1912
Colonel (Commanding officer, 22nd Engineers) - 4 December 1916
Colonel (Commanding officer, 102nd Engineers), National Army - 1 October 1917
Brigadier General, National Army - 12 July 1918 
Honorably discharged from active service - 3 January 1919

References

See also

 Legion of Honour
 List of Legion of Honour recipients by name (V)
 List of foreign recipients of the Legion of Honour by country
 Legion of Honour Museum

External links 

Cornelius Vanderbilt Papers (MS 1181). Manuscripts and Archives, Yale University Library.

1873 births
1942 deaths
St. Paul's School (New Hampshire) alumni
American socialites
United States Army generals of World War I
United States Army generals
Cornelius III
American people of Dutch descent
American people of English descent
American people of Welsh descent
Commanders of the Order of the Crown (Belgium)
Recipients of the Croix de guerre (Belgium)
Recipients of the Distinguished Service Medal (US Army)
Commandeurs of the Légion d'honneur
New York (state) Republicans
Florida Republicans
Psi Upsilon
Burials at the Vanderbilt Family Cemetery and Mausoleum